Sibal was a South Korean automotive brand. It was the first passenger vehicle produced in South Korea, from May 1955 to August 1963. The word Sibal means 'inception' or 'beginning'.

The first Sibal was hand-built by brothers Choi Mu-seong, Choi Hae-seong and Choi Soon-seong, based on the famous Willys Jeep. Initial demands for Sibal were low. However, after winning a presidential award, production began to flourish.

Overview

First produced in 1955, the Sibal was initially hand-built using mostly imported parts, and a body shell made from old oil drums. Based on the Willys Jeep, production was slow until the vehicle gained a presidential award, whereupon it became a relatively popular choice for Korean taxi firms.

In 1962 the Korean government instigated The Automobile Industry Protection Act, forcing foreign manufacturers to create partnerships with existing automotive companies.  As a result early versions of companies such as Kia, SsangYong and others gained cheap inroads to Korea, and the Sibal was discontinued in 1963.

See also
 Jiefang CA-30

Notes

Cars of South Korea